The Shirataka (”White hawk”) was a 1st class torpedo boat (suiraitei) of the Imperial Japanese Navy. She was ordered under the Ten Year Naval Expansion Programme passed in 1896 from the shipbuilder Schichau-Werke (as Yard No. 629) in Danzig, Germany, where she was built during 1897–98 in parts along Japanese specifications, and then re-assembled by Mitsubishi in Nagasaki, Japan.

She participated in the Russo-Japanese War (1904–1905). She was decommissioned on 15 November 1923, and sold to break up on 6 April 1927.

Design
In common with all the other early torpedo boat destroyers and 1st class torpedo boats, the Shirataka had a "turtle-back" forecastle intended to prevent seawater covering the forecastle and throwing excessive spray over the control area. Unlike the two-funnel Hayabusa class, the Shirataka had a single funnel amidships, and was completed with three 3-pounder (42mm) QF guns (two abreast just forward of the funnel, and one aft on the centreline). These were later replaced by two 57mm guns and one 47mm 40-cal gun. She also carried three 14-inch torpedo tubes (two abreast just abaft of the funnel, and one aft of the gun on the centreline).

Her machinery comprised two Schichau water-tube boilers, and two 3-cylinder VTE engines developing 2,600 ihp. She carried 30 tons of coal.

References
 Kaigun: Strategy, Tactics, and Technology in the Imperial Japanese Navy, 1887–1941, David C. Evans, Mark R. Peattie, Naval Institute Press, Annapolis, Maryland 
 The Origins of Japanese Trade Supremacy: Development and Technology in Asia from 1540 to the Pacific War, Christopher Howe, The University of Chicago Press, 

 The Imperial Japanese Navy of the Russo-Japanese War. Mark E. Stille, Osprey Publishing, Oxford, 2016. 
 The Imperial Japanese Navy, 1869–1945. Anthony John Watts & Brian Glynn Gordon, Macdonald & Co. (Publishers) Ltd, London, 1971. 
 Warships of the Imperial Japanese Navy, 1869–1945. Hansgeorg Jentschura, Dieter Jung & Peter Mickel, Arms & Armour, London, 1977.  

Ships built in Danzig
1899 ships
Torpedo boats of the Imperial Japanese Navy